Sneha Sedu is a 1978 Indian Kannada-language film directed by V. Madhusudhana Rao starring Vishnuvardhan, Ambareesh , Manjula and Anupama Mohan. The supporting cast features Vajramuni, Narasimharaju, Balakrishna and Chindodi Leela. The movie was remade in Malayalam in 1979 as Angakkuri starring Jayan, Sukumaran, Jayabharathi and Seema.

Cast 
 Vishnuvardhan
 Ambareesh
 Manjula
 Anupama Mohan (kuchipudi dancer)
 Vajramuni
 Shivaram
 Narasimharaju
 Balakrishna
 Chindodi Leela

Soundtrack
The music of Sneha Sedu was composed by S. Rajeswara Rao, with lyrics for the soundtrack penned by Chi. Udaya Shankar.

References

External links 
 

1978 films
1970s Kannada-language films
Films directed by V. Madhusudhana Rao
Films scored by S. Rajeswara Rao
Indian thriller films
Kannada films remade in other languages
1970s thriller films